Dato' Abdullah Sani bin Abdul Hamid (Jawi: عبدالله ثاني بن عبدالحميد; born 15 February 1962) is a Malaysian politician and the Member of Parliament (MP) of Malaysia for the Kapar constituency in Selangor. He is a member of the People's Justice Party (PKR) in the Pakatan Harapan (PH) ruling coalition. He was the MP for the Kuala Langat constituency previously from 2008 to 2018.

Born in Perak, and with a background as a trade unionist, Abdullah Sani was elected to Parliament in the 2008 general election, narrowly winning the seat of Kuala Langat from the ruling Barisan Nasional coalition. He was re-elected in the 2013 general election with an increased margin. In 2013 he also won election as deputy president of the Malaysian Trades Union Congress. He was a prominent player in the 2014 Kajang Move, an internal PKR machination to oust Selangor's Chief Minister, and PKR member, Khalid Ibrahim. He is also a member of the Central Leadership Council of PKR.

In the 2018 general election, Abdullah Sani contested and won the Kapar parliamentary seat.

Election results

Honours
  :
  Member of the Order of Loyalty to Negeri Sembilan (ANS) (1991)
  Knight Commander of the Order of Tuanku Jaafar (DPTJ) – Dato' (2001)
  Knight Companion of the Order of Loyalty to Negeri Sembilan (DSNS) – Dato' (2005)
  :
  Officer of the Order of the Defender of State (DSPN) – Dato' (2016)

See also
 Kuala Langat (federal constituency)
 Kapar (federal constituency)

References

Living people
1962 births
People from Perak
Malaysian people of Malay descent
Malaysian Muslims
Malaysian trade unionists
People's Justice Party (Malaysia) politicians
Members of the Dewan Rakyat
21st-century Malaysian politicians